A referendum on holding a constitutional convention was held in the US Virgin Islands on 3 November 2020 alongside general elections. 72% of voters responding to the referendum question voted in favor and turnout was above the threshold required.

Background
The islands' first constitutional convention was held from 1964 to 1965 after members were elected in 1964. Although the convention approved a draft constitution in February 1965, it was not adopted by the United States Congress, although some elements became law. A second convention was held in 1971–1972, and although the draft constitution was approved by a majority of voters in a 1972 referendum, VI delegate Ron de Lugo believed the low turnout meant the constitution did not have sufficient mandate from the people and did not take it to Congress.

The third constitution convention was held between 1977 and 1978, but this time voters rejected the draft document in a 1979 referendum. A fourth convention was held in 1980, with the draft again rejected by voters in a 1981 referendum. The fifth convention was held in 2009, but failed to agree on a draft by 2012 and was dissolved.

On 7 May 2020 the Legislature passed law 8308, which proposed a non-binding referendum on electing a constitutional convention. Governor Albert Bryan signed the law the following day. In order for the convention to be called at the Legislature's option, at least 50% of voters participating in the general election had to answer the referendum question, and a majority of those answering it had to vote in favor.

Results
A total of 18,130 voters participated in the general election, of which 10,115 (56%) answered the referendum question. With a majority of those voting also voting in favor, the proposal was approved.

References

United States Virgin
2020 in the United States Virgin Islands
Referendums in the United States Virgin Islands
Election and referendum articles with incomplete results
Constitutional convention ballot measures in the United States